John Sundberg (20 December 1920 – 10 February 2004) was a Swedish sport shooter. He competed in various rifle events at the 1956 and 1964 Summer Olympics and won a bronze medal in 50 metre rifle three positions in 1956. Sundberg won several medals at the world championships of 1954–1955, in the 50 and 300 m distances, kneeling and lying positions, individual and with the Swedish team.

References

1920 births
2004 deaths
People from Gävle
Swedish male sport shooters
Olympic shooters of Sweden
Olympic bronze medalists for Sweden
Shooters at the 1956 Summer Olympics
Shooters at the 1964 Summer Olympics
Medalists at the 1956 Summer Olympics
Olympic medalists in shooting
Sportspeople from Gävleborg County
20th-century Swedish people
21st-century Swedish people